The 1923 Waratahs tour of New Zealand was a series of rugby union games undertaken by the New South Wales Teams against invitational and national teams of New Zealand.

The Queensland Rugby Union had collapsed in 1919 and would not be reborn until 1929 leaving the New South Wales Rugby Union to administer the game in Australia at the national representative level. In 1923 the New South Wales side toured New Zealand

Previously the All Blacks visited New South Wales in the 1922 tour.

Matches 
Scores and results list Waratahs' points tally first.

Notes

References
All found on link
 The Advertiser Monday 20 August 1923 p 14
 The Sydney Morning Herald Friday 24 August 1923
 The Argus Thursday 30 August 1923 p 10 
 The Sydney Morning Herald Friday 7 September 1923 p 12 
 The Sydney Morning Herald Monday 10 September 1923 p 12 Article

Waratahs
Australia national rugby union team tours of New Zealand
New South Wales rugby union team tours
1923 in Australian rugby union